Splachnales is the botanical name of an order of Bryophyta or leafy mosses.

References

External links 

 
Moss orders